Blepharomastix glaucinalis is a moth in the family Crambidae. It was described by George Hampson in 1917. It is found in Bolivia.

The forewings are glossy grey-brown with a white discoidal bar. The hindwings are pale glossy grey-brown.

References

Moths described in 1917
Blepharomastix